Peter Clarke (7 October 1948 – 21 January 2007) was a prominent child welfare activist in Wales.

Clarke was born in Llandudno.  His early life included military training at Sandhurst, from which he moved on to social work in London and Brighton, studying philosophy (BA & MA) at Sussex University.

Clarke worked first at the Stamford House Remand Home in London. In 1985 he became community care advisor for the Spastics Society (now named Scope). From 1991 he was a director of the National Schizophrenia Fellowship, and from 1995 a director of Childline Cymru and worked for many voluntary organisations. He is most well known for his work as Children's Commissioner for Wales, a post created in 2001 which he held until his death at age 58 from cancer.

External links
Obituary from the BBC
Obituary in The Times

1948 births
2007 deaths
Deaths from cancer in Wales
Children's Commissioners for Wales
Welsh social workers
People from Llandudno
Alumni of the University of Sussex
Graduates of the Royal Military Academy Sandhurst